Passage Through Time is the debut album of Canadian hip hop production team Da Grassroots, released November 9, 1999 in the United States. It was released independently on Conception Records. The album features MCs from Toronto's underground hip hop scene. "Price of Livin'", "Thematics", and "Body Language" are singles from the album.

Reception

The album received high critical acclaim. Amazon.com gave the album a favorable review, calling the group "Masters of understated musical eloquence," also stating "This is what good music sounds like." Allmusic gave it 4 out of 5 stars, stating "All in all, this album is a great example of the talent north of the border that has often been overlooked by the mass media channels."

Track listing

† These songs do not appear on the album and are not credited in the liner notes.

Samples
"Thematics" – Contains a sample of "Stakes Is High" by De La Soul
"Precious Metals" – Contains a sample of "Pastures" by Ahmad Jamal
"Price of Livin'" – Contains a sample of "You Know the Deal" by Bennie Maupin
"Black Dove" – Contains a sample of "The Frustrated Nigga" by Jeru the Damaja

References

1999 debut albums
Da Grassroots albums